Chavous is a surname. Notable people with the surname include:

Barney Chavous (born 1951), American football player
Corey Chavous (born 1976), American football player
Kevin P. Chavous (born 1956), American attorney, author, education reform activist, and politician
Wendell Chavous (born 1985), American professional stock car racing driver and entrepreneur